"Love Is the Price" is a song by Swiss artist DJ BoBo, released in 1996 as a single from his remix-album, Just for You (1995). It features vocals by singer Natascha Wright and peaked at number 11 in Germany and Switzerland, number 12 in Finland and number 13 in Austria. On the Eurochart Hot 100, it reached number 28.

Critical reception
Pan-European magazine Music & Media praised the song as "great" and "mellow", and compared it to the work of LL Cool J.

Track listing

Charts

Weekly charts

Year-end charts

References

 

1996 singles
1996 songs
DJ BoBo songs
English-language Swiss songs
ZYX Music singles